Jonathan Lindseth (born 25 February 1996) is a Norwegian footballer who plays for CSKA Sofia.

Career statistics

Club

References

1996 births
Living people
Norwegian footballers
Association football midfielders
Eliteserien players
Norwegian First Division players
First Professional Football League (Bulgaria) players
Odds BK players
Mjøndalen IF players
Sarpsborg 08 FF players
PFC CSKA Sofia players
Norwegian expatriate footballers
Expatriate footballers in Bulgaria
Sportspeople from Skien